The Association of North East Councils was a partnership body made up of representatives of local authorities in North East England. It was a regional grouping of the Local Government Association.

In April 2009 it assumed the role of the regional Local Authority Leaders’ Board following the abolition of the North East Assembly.

It closed in March 2016, following the creation of a North East Combined Authority, which comprises local authorities outside of Tees Valley; with Tees Valley local authorities forming the separate Tees Valley Combined Authority.

External links
Association of North East Councils
Strategy Integration North East

References

Local authority leaders' boards in England
Local government in North East England
Local Government Association
2009 establishments in England
2016 disestablishments in England